is a private junior college in Kyōtanabe, Kyoto, Japan.

History 
（References:）
 In 1986 the Junior College was established at City of Kyōtanabe.
 In 1999 the Junior College was the last year of registration of student.
 In 2003 the Junior College was discontinued.

Names of Academic department 
 Japanese language and Literature 
 English language

Advanced course 
 None

See also 
 Doshisha Women's College of Liberal Arts
 Doshisha University

External links

References

Japanese junior colleges
Educational institutions established in 1986
Christian universities and colleges in Japan
Private universities and colleges in Japan
Universities and colleges in Kyoto Prefecture
Women's universities and colleges in Japan
1986 establishments in Japan